The Dushanbe Stadium is a football stadium currently under construction in Dushanbe, Tajikistan, which was planned to be opened in 2021. The venue will have a capacity of 30,000 spectators.

Plans 
The area of the football field will be . The stadium will consist of four stands, which will be placed on two tiers.

The construction of auxiliary facilities, such as an elevator, an electrical substation, a fire extinguishing pool and parking for 2,000 cars, is planned on the stadium territory. For guests it is planned to build separate rooms with a total of 448 places, walkways at a height of more than {{convert|9|m} and other supporting facilities.

References

Football venues in Tajikistan
Stadiums under construction
Buildings and structures in Dushanbe